Melun station (French: Gare de Melun) is a railway station in Melun, Seine-et-Marne, Paris, France. The station was opened on 3 January 1849 and is on the Paris–Marseille railway. The station is served by Paris' express suburban rail system, the RER. The train services are operated by SNCF.

Train services 
The station is served by the following service(s):

Regional services (TER Bourgogne-Franche-Comté) Paris–Montereau–Sens–Laroche-Migennes
Regional services (Transilien) Paris–Melun–Moret–Nemours–Montargis
Regional services (Transilien) Paris–Melun–Moret–Montereau
Regional services (Transilien) Melun–Champagne-sur-Seine–Montereau
intercity services (Ouigo) Paris - Dijon - Lyon
Local services (RER D) Goussainville–St Denis–Paris–Villeneuve St Georges–Combs la Ville–Melun
Local services (RER D) Gare de Lyon–Juvisy–Grigny–Corbeil–Melun
Local services (RER D) Juvisy–Évry–Corbeil–Melun

References

External links 

 
 
Transilien Network Map

Railway stations in Seine-et-Marne
Réseau Express Régional stations
Railway stations in France opened in 1849
Melun